The Angrez is a 2005 Indian Hyderabadi-language comedy film directed by Kuntaa Nikkil. In this film, the word "Angrez" refers to English people and non-resident Indians. The film was a trend-setter at that time, as it was one of the first to effectively and humorously, often resorting to the slapstick kind, portray the dialect of the Old City, Hyderabad and the Hyderabadi tongue. The film also portrays the fascination for American materialism, the hype around the IT industry and the lifestyle and culture it has spawned.

Plot
The movie revolves around three sets of people.
 The Angrez – Two guys who come from the United States to serve in a call center company.
 Ismail ‘Bhai’ & gang – A bunch of locals from the Old City Area
 Mama a.k.a. Annaa & gang – Local gangsters

Two NRI persons, Pranay and Rochak, come to Hyderabad to take up jobs in their friend's company and settle in Hyderabad. Based in the old city, Ismail bhai (Dheer Charan Srivastav) and the gang meet up near Charminar and start their daily routine with gossips, babble and talks of bravery. Ismail bhai is apparently the gang leader and his gang comprises Saleem ‘Pheku’ (Mast Ali) - a habitual liar, Jahangir – a self claimed hardcore gangster, Gafoor and Chaus who all follow Ismail Bhai throughout the film.

While visiting the old city, Pranay and Rochak meet Ismail's gang at a hotel in the old city. Ismail's gang gets into a spat with Pranay and Rochak. Rochak and Pranay are guided to safety by their guide as they are chased by the Ismail bhai gang. While Pranay and Rochak are engaged in love affairs in their office, Ismail bhai and his gang keeps planning a strategy to seek their revenge.

Meanwhile, Ramesh, Pranay's cousin (who is also their butler) colludes with Mama, the typical gangster of the Hyderabadi underworld, to kidnap Pranay for ransom. Mama and his goons take up the assignment and the plan is set in motion.

Ismail Bhai is still enraged as he believes that the harmless spat is now a matter worth dying for and is a matter of his Izzat (honour). On the other side of the town, Mama and his gang enter the residence of the NRIs, at the same time the Ismail bhai gang after sniffing out their whereabouts go into the NRI's house at night to seek their revenge and restore Ismail bhai's image. Mama and gang mistakenly kidnap Rochak. Ismail Bhai and gang return from their mission failing as usual. Rochak finds out the mastermind behind the kidnapping and bribes the guard and warns Pranai of his cousin's intentions.

Ismail Bhai and Mama gang have a brush against each other. Pranay and Rochak succeed in making the two gangs fight against each other and manage their escape. As Mama and his gang is nabbed by the Hyderabad Police, Ismail bhai and gang returns to Charminar after being heavily assaulted by Mama and his goons. And life, in Hyderabadi style, goes on as usual for the Ismail Bhai's gang.

Cast
 Kuntaa Nikkil as Pranai Nerella 
 Ganesh Venkatraman as Rochak Suddala
 Dheer Charan Srivastav as Ismail Bhai
 Mast Ali as Saleem Pheku
 Aziz Naser as Jahangir
Kranthi Kiran Kamaraju as Prakash
 Raghu Karumanchi as Nerella Ramesh, Pranai's cousin
 Jeevan Shekhar Reddy as Prasad, Pranai and Rochak's guide cum colleague
 Tara D'Souza as Sheetal
 Soumya Bollapragada as Tanya
 RK as Mama
Shehnaz as Lotus

Production
The director and writer of the movie, Kuntaa Nikkil, who also played the lead character 'Pranai' in the film, had already worked as an assistant director in the United States. He had worked on the script for 'The Angrez' for over two years. He met numerous people, investigated the culture of NRI's living in Hyderabad, and learned about the working conditions in call centres. To understand the culture of the old city he would secretly capture the expressions of people from the old city. When a half-hour promo was shot on DV camera nobody was willing to produce the movie. Then Sreedhar Rao stepped forward and decided to produce the movie since he felt that the movie had highlighted the core culture of the city.

Reception

Release 
The movie was released initially only in four theatres in Hyderabad, but later on it was released in many theatres in Hyderabad and CDs/DVDs were released only after it completed 25 weeks by Hyderabad-based home video company Shalimar Video. The producer petitioned the Department of Tourism to promote the film to raise interest in the Hyderabad area.
The directors and producers believe that this movie covers the entire Hyderabadi culture, right from bonalu to baraat, from biryani to the pub life. The five-minute rap song 'Hyderabadi Biryani' was shot in 77 different locations of Hyderabad like the Chudi Bazaar, Taramati Baradari and Tank Bund. The producers had to do a lot of running about since there were only a few takers. Released with just two prints, the film gradually headed for the fifth week and then was all set for a country wide opening. The film created a record by running to packed houses in a single theatre for over 25 weeks. And made a record sale of 5 million copies at the launch of VCD and DVD by Hyderabad-based home video company Shalimar Video.

Impact on the movie industry
Though the movie failed to attract the mainstream film industry, it started off the infectious trend of making comedy movies based on the Hyderabadi culture. In a matter of a year and a half, there were about a half a dozen releases, like Kal ka Nawab, Hyderabad Nawaabs, Aadab Hyderabad, Hungama in Dubai among others. But none of them quite succeeded in creating the effect and the charm of the original, though these movies were popular among the Old City residents. The success of The Angrez can be attributed to the spontaneity of the humour whereas in the movies that followed, the humour looks forced. The film not only gained popularity in Andhra Pradesh and the other parts of India but also among the large diaspora in the Middle-East and the US, attributed to the Internet and availability of original as well as unlicensed DVDs. With unauthorized DVDs being released in huge numbers, several raids were conducted and lakhs of illicit copies were recovered.

Sequel
A sequel to the movie The Angrez 2 was released in the year 2015

See also
List of Hyderabadi-language films

References

External links

2005 films
Indian comedy films
2000s Hindi-language films
Films set in Hyderabad, India
2005 comedy films
English-language Indian films